On 3 June 1990, Yugoslavia hosted the Netherlands in an international friendly at Zagreb's Maksimir stadium. The match was the last preparation friendly (known as the dress rehearsal) for Ivica Osim's Yugoslavia side ahead of the 1990 FIFA World Cup in Italy. However, the contest is mostly remembered for the controversy raised due to the spectator behaviour: throughout the match, a nationalist Croat crowd of 20,000 shouted down the Yugoslav national anthem, insulted Yugoslav team players and jeered the head coach. Play on the pitch quickly became secondary as the match turned into another football-related incident reflecting ethnic tensions and rising nationalism in the Socialist Federal Republic of Yugoslavia.

Background
Although on what would soon turn out to be its last legs, SFR Yugoslavia (multi-ethnic federation made up of six constituent republics) still existed as a state in 1990 while Socialist Republic of Croatia was its second largest constituent republic populated mostly by ethnic Croats with a large ethnic Serb minority.

Ten years following the death of Yugoslav lifetime president Josip Broz Tito, SFR Yugoslavia was crippled by rising ethnic tensions. In parallel, in the wake of the fall of the Berlin Wall, the country was transitioning its system of governance from communist one-party system to democratic multi-party system.

SR Croatia's first parliamentary elections took place from 22 April to 7 May 1990 with nationalist right-wing Croatian Democratic Union (HDZ) led by Franjo Tuđman winning in a landslide.

With tensions running high, a football riot took place on 13 May 1990, at Maksimir during a Yugoslav First League match between the Croatian club Dinamo Zagreb and the Serbian club Red Star Belgrade. Croatian midfielder Zvonimir Boban kicked the policeman Refik Ahmetović and as a result got suspended by the Football Association of Yugoslavia (FSJ) for six months, causing him to miss the 1990 FIFA World Cup as well as the pre-tournament preparation friendlies.

Game
The exhibition versus the Netherlands took place on 3 June and was the last exhibition before the 1990 FIFA World Cup. The crowd of 20,000 booed the Yugoslav national anthem "Hey, Slavs". Fans cheered for the Netherlands, heckling the Yugoslav team and its manager Ivica Osim. Many Dutch flags were also seen in the crowd, owing to their similarity to the Croatian tricolour (red, white and blue).

Aftermath
The match was the last of the Yugoslav team to be played in Maksimir. On 17 October of that year the Croatian national team played its first international match in Maksimir against the United States.

Match details

Footnotes

See also
 Dinamo–Red Star riot

External links
Video: Yugoslavia - Netherlands

1990
1990
Sports competitions in Zagreb
1989–90 in Yugoslav football
1989–90 in Croatian football
1989–90 in Dutch football
International association football matches
June 1990 sports events in Europe
1990s in Zagreb